This list of systems of plant taxonomy presents "taxonomic systems" used in plant classification.

A taxonomic system is a coherent whole of taxonomic judgments on circumscription and placement of the considered taxa. It is only a "system" if it is applied to a large group of such taxa (for example, all the flowering plants).

There are two main criteria for this list. A system must be taxonomic, that is deal with many plants, by their botanical names. Secondly it must be a system, i.e. deal with the relationships of plants. Although thinking about relationships of plants had started much earlier (see history of plant systematics), such systems really only came into being in the 19th century,  as a result of an ever-increasing influx from all over the world of newly discovered plant species. The 18th century saw some early systems, which are perhaps precursors rather than full taxonomic systems.

A milestone event was the publication of Species Plantarum by Linnaeus which serves as the starting point of binomial nomenclature for plants. By its size this would qualify to be on this list, but it does not deal with relationships, beyond assigning plants into genera.

Note that a system is not necessarily monolithic and often goes through several stages of development, resulting in several versions of the same system. When a system is widely adopted, many authors will adopt their own particular version of the system. The Cronquist system is well known for existing in many versions.

Chronological list of systems

Pre-Linnaean 

Theophrastus classification
Historia Plantarum (Enquiry into Plants), c. 300 BC
Causes of Plants, c. 300 BC
Dioscorides classification
De Materia Medica, c. 60 AD
Albertus Magnus classification
De Vegetabilibus, c. 1256 
Caesalpino classification
De plantis libri XVI, 1583
John Gerard classification
 Herball, or Generall Historie of Plantes, 1597
Gaspard Bauhin classification
 Pinax theatri botanici, 1623
John Ray classification
 Historia Plantarum, 1686–1704
Tournefort classification
 Éléments de botanique, 1694

From Linnaeus to Darwin (pre-Darwinian)
 Linnaean systems
Systema Naturae, 1st edition, 1735.
Systema Naturae, 10th edition, 1758 (vol. 1), 1759 (vol. 2). Starting point of zoological nomenclature.
Species Plantarum, 1753. Starting point of botanical nomenclature.
Genera Plantarum, 1737 (1st ed.), 1753 (5th ed.).
Philosophia Botanica, 1751.
Adanson system
  Familles naturelles des plantes, 1763.
 de Jussieu system

(available online at Gallica)
 de Candolle system
A. P. de Candolle (1819). Théorie Élémentaire de la botanique, ou exposition des principes de la classification naturelle et de l'art de décrire et d'etudier les végétaux (2nd ed.).

(available online at Gallica)
 Berchtold and Presl system
 Berchtold and Presl. O Prirozenosti Rostlin 1820
 Dumortier system
 
 Lindley system

(available online at BHL)

(available online at BHL)
 Bentham & Hooker system

(available online at Gallica)
 Baillon system

Post Darwinian (Phyletic) 

 Eichler system

 Van Tieghem system
 
  Engler system 

 Dalla Torre & Harms system

 Bessey system
Charles E. Bessey (1907). "A Synopsis of Plant Phyla". Univ. Nebraska Studies 7: 275–358.

 Wettstein system

 Rendle system
Alfred Barton Rendle.  The Classification of Flowering Plants 1904, 1925
 Lotsy system
 Johannes Paulus Lotsy. Vorträge über botanische Stammesgeschichte, gehalten an der Reichsuniversität zu Leiden. Ein Lehrbuch der Pflanzensystematik. 1907–1911
 Hallier system
 
 Warming system

 Hutchinson system

 Calestani system
 
 Kimura system

  Benson system
 Lyman David Benson. Plant Classification 1957
 Emberger system

 Melchior system
 (also known as modified Engler system, in Angiospermae)
 Takhtajan system

 Cronquist system

 Thorne system

 Stebbins system
Stebbins, G.L. (1974). Flowering plants: evolution above the species level. Cambridge, Massachusetts: Harvard University Press, . [System followed by Heywood, V.H. (ed., 1978). Flowering plants of the world. Oxford: Oxford University Press, .]
 Dahlgren system

 Goldberg system
 (available online: Full text (PDF) here) [there is also a comparison among 11 Dicotyledons systems since 1960 until 1985]
 (available online: Full text (PDF) here)
 Kubitzki system (1990- )

 Shipunov system (1991–)
(Available online: Full text PDF )
 Reveal system (1997)
 Reveal System of Classification 1997
 Judd system (1999–2016)
 (Modified APG)
 
 
 APG system
APG I (1998)

 APG II (2003)

(Available online: Abstract | Full text (HTML) | Full text (PDF))
 APG III (2009)

()
Chase & Reveal System (2009)

(Available online at doi link.)
 APG IV (2016)

Other systems
 Bartling system
 Deyl system
 Endlicher system
 Fritsch system (algae)
 Gundersen system
 Hallier system
 Hoek, Mann and Jahns system (algae)
 Mez system
 Novák system
 Pascher system (algae)
 Pteridophyte Phylogeny Group system
 Pulle system
 Rafinesque system
 Rouleau system
 Smith system (cryptogams – algae, fungi, bryophytes and pteridophytes)
 Skottsberg system
 Soó system
 Strasburguer system
 Tippo system

References

External links 
 List of systems on a Russian server, by Alexey Shipunov
 Minelli, Alessandro (1993). Biological Systematics. The State of the Art. Chapman & Hall, London. 387 pp. Appendices 2–23, with major systematic works.
 Review of systems 1703–1845, in Lindley, John (1846): The Vegetable Kingdom
 Rao M. M., Reddy, S.M. (2007), Plant Taxonomy: Systems of Classification, in Reddy S. M. et al. (eds.) University Botany – 3, New Age International, pp. 7–32

Bibliography